The Boxers is an outdoor 1987 steel and lacquer sculpture by Keith Haring, installed in Berlin, Germany.

See also

 1987 in art

References

External links
 

1987 sculptures
Keith Haring
Outdoor sculptures in Berlin
Statues in Germany
Steel sculptures in Germany